Umair Ali (born 3 March 1986) is a Pakistani-born cricketer who played for the United Arab Emirates national cricket team. He made his Twenty20 International debut against Scotland in the 2015 ICC World Twenty20 Qualifier tournament on 9 July 2015. He made his One Day International debut against Hong Kong in the 2015–17 ICC World Cricket League Championship on 16 November 2015. In July 2020, he was targeting a return to the national team, after a gap of five years.

References

External links
 

1986 births
Living people
Emirati cricketers
United Arab Emirates One Day International cricketers
United Arab Emirates Twenty20 International cricketers
People from Karachi
Pakistani emigrants to the United Arab Emirates
Pakistani expatriate sportspeople in the United Arab Emirates